Channarayana Durga is a hill fort near to madhugiri, Tumakuru district, Karnataka, South West India. It is approximately 100 km from Bengaluru.

History
The fort was constructed by a local king (Paalegaara) Chikkappa Gowda, who was ruling the Madhugiri and surrounding areas. It is a hilltop fort near Madhugiri in Tumkur district of Karnataka. There are few temples and old structures inside the fort. This is one of the ideal trekking destinations around Bangalore. Channarayana Durga was strategic fortress during medieval times and many battles were fought for its possession. The fort was originally built by Channapa Gouda in the 17th-century, a feudal lord from Madhugiri. Later the fort fell into the hands of the Marathas. But in subsequent year’s control of the fort changed several times between Marathas and Mysore Wodeyars. The British took over the fort during third Mysore war and then abandoned it.

Best season to Trek 

Channarayana Durga trek can be classified as moderate. During the monsoons, this initial trek would be difficult as the smooth rock would become slippery. The trek to Channarayana Durga is quite interesting and there are no signboards with very few tourists visiting. It takes about a half day to trek to the top and explores the fort. The best time to visit Channarayana Durga is from September to December. The average elevation is 3,730 feet

Image Gallery

Sources

http://www.deccanherald.com/content/242468/legends-midigeshi-durga.html

Forts in Karnataka
Buildings and structures in Tumkur district